Graça Machel    (born 17 October 1945) is a Mozambican politician and humanitarian. She is the widow of former President of Mozambique Samora Machel (1975–1986) and former President of South Africa Nelson Mandela (1998–2013). Machel is an international advocate for women's and children's rights and was made an honorary British Dame by Queen Elizabeth II in 1997 for her humanitarian work. She is the only woman in modern history to have served as First Lady of two countries, South Africa and Mozambique.

Graça Machel is a member of the Africa Progress Panel (APP), a group of ten distinguished individuals who advocate at the highest levels for equitable and sustainable development in Africa. As a panel member she facilitates coalition building to leverage and broker knowledge, and convenes decision-makers to influence policy for lasting change in Africa.

She was chancellor of the University of Cape Town between 1999 and 2019.

Early life and education

Graça Simbine was born 17 days after her father's death, the youngest of six children, in rural Incadine, Gaza Province, Portuguese East Africa (modern-day Mozambique). She attended Methodist mission schools before gaining a scholarship to the University of Lisbon in Portugal, where she studied German and first became involved in independence issues.

Machel also speaks French, Spanish, Italian, Portuguese and English, as well as her native Xitsonga language.

Political career 
Simbine returned to Portuguese East Africa in 1973, joining the Mozambican Liberation Front (FRELIMO) and working as a schoolteacher. Following Mozambique's independence in 1975, Simbine was appointed Mozambican first Minister of Education and Culture on 25 June 1975.

During her tenure, the number of students enrolled in primary and secondary schools rose from about 40 percent of all school-aged children to over 90 percent for males and 75 percent for females.

Later career 
Graça Machel received the 1992 Africa Prize, awarded annually to an individual who has contributed to the goal of eliminating hunger in Africa by the year 2000. Machel received the 1995 Nansen Medal from the United Nations in recognition of her longstanding humanitarian work, particularly on behalf of refugee children.

In 1997, Machel was honored with the Dame Commander of the Order of the British Empire by Queen Elizabeth II for her contributions and services in the field of human rights protection. In the same year, she received the Global Citizen Award of the New England Circle. 1998, Machel was one of the two winners of the North–South Prize awarded by the North-South Centre of the Council of Europe.

Machel was chancellor of the University of Cape Town from 1999 to 2019. In 2009, Machel was appointed to the Commonwealth of Nations' Eminent Persons Group. She was named president of the School of Oriental and African Studies at the University of London in 2012. In 2016, Machel was named chancellor of the African Leadership University, a role that she still holds today.

In July 2017, Machel was elected an Honorary Fellow of the British Academy (HonFBA), the United Kingdom's national academy for the humanities and social sciences.
In 2018, she was awarded by the World Health Organization for her contributions to the health and wellbeing of women, children and adolescents.

On 17 July 2018, Machel attended the 16th Nelson Mandela Annual Lecture, which was located at the Wanderers Stadium, Johannesburg, alongside South African President Cyril Ramaphosa and former US President Barack Obama. The event was visited by nearly 15,000 people, commemorating the 100th anniversary of Nelson Mandela's birth.

In the leadup to COP27, Machel advocates that Africa's youth should have a greater say in climate politics and warned that existing development aid programs covering, for example, education may well be cut and diverted to fund climate change adaptation instead.

United Nations 
Following her retirement from the Mozambique ministry, Machel was appointed as the expert in charge of producing the groundbreaking United Nations report on the impact of armed conflict on children. From 2008 until 2009, she was a member of the High Level Taskforce on Innovative International Financing for Health Systems, co-chaired by Gordon Brown and Robert Zoellick. She served as the Chair of The Partnership for Maternal, Newborn & Child Health (PMNCH) from 2013-2018. In January 2016, she was also appointed by United Nations Secretary-General Ban Ki-moon to the High-level Advisory Group for Every Woman Every Child.

On 17 January 2016, she was announced by the UNESCO as a Sustainable Development Goals Advocate alongside 16 others, all appointed by Secretary-General of the United Nations

The Elders 
On 18 July 2007 in Johannesburg, South Africa, Nelson Mandela, Graça Machel, and Desmond Tutu convened The Elders. Mandela announced its formation in a speech on his 89th birthday. The group works on thematic as well as geographically specific subjects. The Elders' priority issue areas include the Israeli–Palestinian conflict, the Korean Peninsula, Sudan and South Sudan, sustainable development, and equality for girls and women.

Machel has been particularly involved in The Elders' work on child marriage, including the founding of Girls Not Brides: The Global Partnership to End Child Marriage.

Other activities 
Corporate boards
 Whatana Investment Group, chairwoman of the board of directors
 PME African Infrastructure Opportunities, senior advisor (since 2014), independent non-executive member of the board of directors (2007–2014)
 Principle Capital Group, non-executive member of the board of directors (since 2004)
Non-profit organizations
 Africa Progress Panel (APP), member
 African Child Policy Forum (ACPF), chairwoman of the international board of trustees
 ACCORD, chairwoman of the board of trustees (since 2008)
 Association of European Parliamentarians with Africa (AWEPA), chair of the Eminent Advisory Board
 Mo Ibrahim Foundation, member of the board
 Nelson Mandela Children's Hospital, chairwoman of the board of trustees
 Synergos, member of the board of directors
 Foundation for Community Development (FDC), founder and president (since 1994)
 VillageReach, honorary chairwoman of the board of directors
 International Crisis Group (ICG), former member of the board of trustees
 United Nations Foundation, member of the board (1998–2007)
 Forum for African Women Educationalists (FAWE), co-founder and former member of the board (since 1992)

Personal life

Simbine married Samora Machel, the first president of Mozambique, in 1975. Together they had two children: daughter Josina (born April 1976) and son Malengane (born December 1978). Samora Machel died in office in 1986 when his presidential aircraft crashed near the Mozambique-South Africa border. Josina is a women's rights activist and in 2020 was listed as one of the BBC's 100 Women.

Graça Machel Mandela married her second husband, Nelson Mandela, in Johannesburg on 18 July 1998, Mandela's 80th birthday. At the time, Mandela was serving as the first post-apartheid president of South Africa. Mandela died of pneumonia on 5 December 2013.

Honors, awards and international recognition

Honors 
  Grand Cross of the Order of Isabella the Catholic, 1997.
  Honorary Dame Commander of the Order of the British Empire, 1997.
 Honorary Fellow of the British Academy, 2017.

Awards 
 Nansen Medal of the United Nations, 1995.
 Global Citizen Award of the New England Circle, 1997.
 InterAction's Humanitarian Award, 1997.
 North-South Prize of the Council of Europe, 1998.
 Princess of Asturias Award (International Cooperation), 1998.
 World's Children's Prize (together with Nelson Mandela), 2005.
 Decade Child Rights Hero (together with Nelson Mandela) by 7.1 million children through a Global Vote, organized as part of the educational World's Children's Prize Program, 2010.
 World Health Organization Gold Medal, 2018.
 Major award from CARE as result-longstanding work on behalf of children.

Honorary doctorates
 Honorary doctorate of Humane Letters from the University of Massachusetts, 2006.
 Doctor of Philosophy (DPhil) Honoris Causa from the University of Stellenbosch, 2008.
 Doctora Honoris Causa by University of Barcelona, 2008.
 Doutora Honoris Causa by University of Évora, 2008.
Doctor in Laws (LLD) Honoris Causa by Trinity College Dublin, 2015.
 Doctora Honoris Causa by Leiden University, 2021.

References

External links 
 BBC Profile of Graça Machel
 UNICEF Report – Impact of Armed Conflict on Children by Graça Machel
 SAHistory bio
 UN Foundation Bio
 

|-

1945 births
Living people
First Ladies of South Africa
First ladies of Mozambique
Government ministers of Mozambique
Tsonga people
Dames Grand Cross of the Order of Isabella the Catholic
Honorary Dames Commander of the Order of the British Empire
Graca
Mozambican emigrants to South Africa
Mozambican Methodists
Mozambican Marxists
People from Gaza Province
Women government ministers of Mozambique
Honorary Fellows of the British Academy
FRELIMO politicians
University of Lisbon alumni
Chancellors of the University of Cape Town
Fellows of the African Academy of Sciences
Honorary Fellows of the African Academy of Sciences
Nansen Refugee Award laureates